United States Northern Command (USNORTHCOM) is one of eleven unified combatant commands of the United States Department of Defense. The command is tasked with providing military support for non-military authorities in the U.S., and protecting the territory and national interests of the United States within the continental United States, Puerto Rico, Canada, Mexico, The Bahamas, and the air, land and sea approaches to these areas. It is the U.S. military command which, if applicable, would be the primary defender against an invasion of the U.S.

USNORTHCOM was created on 25 April 2002 when President George W. Bush approved a new Unified Command Plan, following the September 11 attacks. USNORTHCOM went operational on 1 October 2002.

Creation
USNORTHCOM was established on 25 April 2002 when President George W. Bush approved a new Unified Command Plan, and attained initial operating capability on 1 October 2002.

Mission
According to the UCP, Northern Command's mission is to:

 Conduct operations to deter, prevent, and defeat threats and aggression aimed at the United States, its territories, and interests within the assigned area of responsibility and,
 As directed by the President or Secretary of Defense provide military assistance to non-military authorities including consequence management operations

Area of responsibility
It also includes the Gulf of Mexico, the Straits of Florida, portions of the Caribbean region to include The Bahamas, Puerto Rico, the U.S. Virgin Islands, the British Virgin Islands, Bermuda, and the Turks and Caicos Islands. The commander of USNORTHCOM is responsible for theater security cooperation with Canada, Mexico, and The Bahamas. In May 2011, NORTHCOM was mobilized in the wake of the BP oil spill in the Gulf of Mexico to provide air, ground, and logistical support. In October 2014, NORTHCOM took administrative control of Alaskan Command.

Organizational structure

Headquarters

Commander, U.S. Northern Command is concurrently Commander of the U.S.-Canadian North American Aerospace Defense Command (NORAD). The two are co-located at Peterson Space Force Base in Colorado Springs, Colorado. General Ralph Eberhart was the first CDRUSNORTHCOM.

USNORTHCOM headquarters has approximately 1,200 uniformed and civilian staff. In its first period of organising in 2002–03, one priority was to hire civilian staff which could help respond to a Weapons of Mass Destruction attack and to coordinate disaster recovery.

Component Commands

Subordinate unified commands

Standing joint task force

Commanders

The commander of United States Northern Command is a four-star general or admiral in the United States Armed Forces who serves as the head of all U.S. military forces within the command's geographical area of responsibility. The commander of U.S. Northern Command concurrently serves as the commander of North American Aerospace Defense Command (NORAD) and is the head of all United States and Canadian joint aerospace military operational forces, stationed within the Northern American territories. The commander of U.S. Northern Command is nominated for appointment by the President of the United States and must be confirmed by the United States Senate. The commander of U.S. Northern Command typically serves for two years.

Note: The National Defense Authorization Act of 2008 stipulates that at least one deputy commander of USNORTHCOM be a National Guard general officer unless the commander is already such an officer.

Planning and strategy
Northern Command has created several classified "concept plans" (e.g. "Defense Support of Civil Authorities") that are intended to address the 15 National Planning Scenarios that NORTHCOM must be prepared to respond to.

However the GAO found that the national strategy to defend the United States is several years out of date.

Domestic operations and training
NORTHCOM operates extensive domestic intelligence operations which both share and receive information from local, state and federal law enforcement agencies. Employees of the Federal Bureau of Investigation, Central Intelligence Agency, National Security Agency, Defense Intelligence Agency, National Geospatial-Intelligence Agency, and other agencies maintain offices at NORTHCOM and receive daily intelligence briefings. The total of 14 agencies with representatives at NORTHCOM in December 2002 included the State Department, NASA, and the Federal Aviation Administration.

Northern Command has completed several joint training exercises with local, state and federal law enforcement agencies, the Department of Homeland Security, and the Federal Emergency Management Agency (FEMA).

In Exercise Vigilant Shield 2008, Northern Command, Pacific Command, the Department of Homeland Security, and numerous law enforcement agencies across the U.S. conducted exercises to test their "response abilities against a variety of potential threats".

Related legislation
The Posse Comitatus Act of 1878 and subsequent Department of Defense policy constrains any member of the United States Army, Air Force, Navy, or Marine Corps, and the National Guard under federal authority from domestically intervening in a law enforcement capacity on United States soil. Several exceptions to the law have been used in the past, including protecting the citizens' constitutional rights in the absence of state and/or local assistance, such as protecting the Little Rock Nine students in Little Rock, Arkansas in 1957, and using the Insurrection Act to quell civil disorders, such as the 1992 Los Angeles riots.

The Military Commissions Act of 2006 lifted many restrictions placed on the military to support non-military authorities by the Posse Comitatus Act, however the United States Supreme Court ruled in June 2008 that significant portions of the MCA were unconstitutional. The "John Warner Defense Authorization Act of 2007" H.R. 5122 (2006) effectively nullified the limits of the Insurrection Act when it was passed; however, the bill was amended in 2008.

On 1 October 2008, the 3rd Infantry Division's 1st Brigade Combat Team was assigned to U.S. Northern Command, marking the first time an active unit had been given a dedicated assignment to Northern Command. The force will be known for the first year as a CBRNE Consequence Management Response Force, and will serve as an on-call federal response force for terrorist attacks and other natural or manmade emergencies and disasters.

See also
 National Defense Authorization Act for Fiscal Year 2012
 NSPD-51
 United States National Guard

References

Further reading
 
 
 NORTHCOM: A Short History Archived

External links
 United States Northern Command

Northern Command
Military units and formations in Colorado
Organizations based in Colorado Springs, Colorado
Military units and formations established in 2002
2002 establishments in the United States
United States–North American relations